Kirsten Elizabeth Pike (born 12 November 1984) is an Australian former cricketer.

Pike, a right-arm fast-medium pace bowler and right-hand batter, played 86 Women's National Cricket League  matches for the Queensland Fire, retiring following the 2013–14 season after helping to win the team's first Twenty20 title. She finished her career as Queensland's all-time leading wicket-taker.
 
Pike also played one Women's Test, 26 Women's One-day Internationals and ten Women's Twenty20 Internationals for the Australian women's cricket team. She is the 153rd woman to play Test cricket for Australia, and the 103rd woman to play One Day International cricket for Australia.

In September 2017 she became the second woman ever elected to the board of directors of Queensland Cricket, and in June 2019 she was appointed the deputy chair. Since retiring from cricket, Pike has participated regularly in the Chain Reaction Challenge Foundation's charity cycling events, which she described as "a fantastic substitute for not playing cricket anymore."

References

1984 births
Australia women One Day International cricketers
Australia women Test cricketers
Australia women Twenty20 International cricketers
Cricketers from Brisbane
Living people